Te Ururoa James William Ben Flavell (born 7 December 1955), also known as Hemi Flavell, is a New Zealand politician who was a co-leader of the Māori Party from 2013 until 2018 and represented the Waiariki electorate for the party in Parliament from 2005–2017.

Ancestry and early life
Flavell, born in Tokoroa, has affiliations to the Ngapuhi, Ngati Rangiwewehi, and Te Arawa iwi. He trained as a teacher, and taught at the secondary and tertiary level for many years. He later held a number of roles in the education sector, including school principal, and then worked as a consultant to various government agencies.

Member of Parliament

In the 2005 general election, Flavell stood as a candidate for the Māori Party in the Waiariki electorate and as 10th on the party list. He won the election against the incumbent, Mita Ririnui, and entered Parliament.

The Waiariki electorate was contested by two contenders in the : the incumbent and Ririnui. Flavell was once again confirmed.

The Waiariki electorate was contested by three contenders in the : Flavell, Annette Sykes of the Mana Party and Louis Te Kani of the Labour Party. Flavell was returned to Parliament for the third successive time.

In the 48th New Zealand Parliament, his primary Māori Party portfolios were Education and Treaty of Waitangi Negotiations. He also held a number of minor portfolios including Tourism, Local Government, Internal Affairs, Sport and Recreation, Land Information and Education Review Office. He was a member and Deputy Chairperson of the Education and Science Select Committee as well as being a current member on the Business Select Committee, Whips Select Committee and Standing Orders Committee.

In July 2007 Flavell's Public Works (Offer Back of and Compensation for Acquired Land) Amendment Bill was drawn from the member's ballot.  It passed its first reading and was sent to select committee in early 2009, but was defeated at its second reading in July 2010.

In May 2010 Flavell's Local Electoral (Māori Representation) Amendment Bill was drawn from the member's ballot.  It was defeated at its first reading in June.

In September 2010 his Gambling (Gambling Harm Reduction) Amendment Bill was drawn from the member's ballot. It was passed in 2013.

With the resignation as party co-leader of Pita Sharples in July 2013, Flavell was elected as co-leader of the Māori Party. The Māori Party also won two seats in the House of Representatives with Flavell serving alongside Marama Fox as co-leaders. Between October 2014 and October 2017, Flavell served as the Minister for Māori Development.

Fellow co-leader Fox also lost her seat, causing the Māori Party to lose its representation in Parliament. Following the party's defeat, Flavell announced his resignation from politics. Fox credited Flavell with successfully lobbying the New Zealand government into recognizing the New Zealand Wars, pardoning Rua Kenana, and ratifying the United Nations Declaration of the Rights of Indigenous Peoples.

Attitude towards Treaty settlement
Speaking in Māori only at the first reading of the Ngāti Mutunga Treaty Settlement Bill in 2006, Flavell referred to the crown as thieves. He said that the thieves who had stolen the land had not returned its full value to the iwi and despite it being a legal full and final settlement invited the tribe to return to Parliament in the future to see if the loaf had got bigger. The tribe was returned $14.9 million and 10 areas of significant land to their 2000 members in addition to the various historical payments and the previous return of 24,000 acres.

References 

|-

|-

|-

Māori Party MPs
1955 births
Living people
New Zealand educators
New Zealand MPs for Māori electorates
Ngāti Rangiwewehi people
Members of the New Zealand House of Representatives
Māori Party co-leaders
People from Tokoroa
21st-century New Zealand politicians
Unsuccessful candidates in the 2017 New Zealand general election